Power & the Glory is the fifth studio album by English heavy metal band Saxon, released in March 1983 by Carrere Records. This is the first Saxon studio album with new drummer Nigel Glockler and was recorded in Atlanta, Georgia in the fall of 1982.

Critical reception 

The album peaked at #15 in the UK Albums Chart. It reached No. 1 in the Metal charts in Sweden, Norway, France and Germany selling over 1.5 million copies worldwide. It was their first album to enter the Billboard 200 in the US, peaking at #155.

A retrospective AllMusic review by Eduardo Rivadavia gave the album three out of five stars. Rivadavia criticised the mixing, saying that the album "sounds as though it was recorded in a tin can, albeit a very, very large tin can" eliminating the "big, in-your-face, and gritty" sound heard on the band's past albums. He also criticised the material itself, saying that "despite a few sparks generated by "Redline," "Warrior," and the proto-thrashing "This Town Rocks," only the anthemic title track ultimately showed enough staying power (and glory) to earn a frequent slot in Saxon's live repertoire". Canadian journalist Martin Popoff writes quite the opposite and considers Power & the Glory Saxon's best album, praising the production and the contribution of "new ass-kicking drummer Nigel Glockler" to "working a metal magic that is the embodiment of the NWOBHM's ideals now made real."

In 2005, Power & the Glory was ranked number 376 in Rock Hard magazine's book The 500 Greatest Rock & Metal Albums of All Time.

Track listing

Song information

Power and the Glory 
"Power and the Glory" was released as a single in April 1983. It reached number 32 on the UK Singles Chart.

The song is an early power metal song with a fast tempo and lyrics relating to war and battles. A music video was made for the song with band members running through a castle with dead dolls.

Personnel 
 Biff Byford – vocals
 Graham Oliver – guitar
 Paul Quinn – guitar
 Steve Dawson – bass guitar
 Nigel Glockler – drums

 Production
 Jeff Glixman – producer
 Jeff Glixman – engineer
 Cheryl Bordagary – engineer
 Les Horn – engineer
 Axis Sound Studio, Atlanta – recording and mixing location
 Nic Tompkin – cover design, photography
 Chris Peyton – design (reissue)
 Gavin Wright – design (reissue)

Charts

Album

Singles

See also 
 List of anti-war songs

References 

1983 albums
Albums produced by Jeff Glixman
Saxon (band) albums
Carrere Records albums